This is a list of Locals of the International Alliance of Theatrical Stage Employees.

United States

National locals 

 International Cinematographers Guild (Local 600)
 Motion Picture Editors Guild (Local 700)

District 1 - Alaska, Idaho, Montana, Oregon, Washington 

 Local 28: Portland, OR
 Local 675: Eugene, OR
 Local 15: Seattle, WA (Western Washington)
 Local 93: Spokane, WA (Eastern Washington)
 Local 488: Studio Mechanics; Pacific Northwest
 Local 154: Ashland, OR

District 2 - Arizona, California, Hawaii, Nevada 

 Local 336: Phoenix, AZ
 Local 415: Tucson, AZ
 Local 50: Sacramento-Stockon, CA
 Local 122: San Diego, CA
 Local 158: Fresno-Modesto-Stockton, CA
 Local 215: Bakersfield, CA
 Local 504: Orange County, CA
 Local 611: Santa Cruz, Monterey, CA
 Local 665: Hawaii
 Local 720: Las Vegas, NV
 Local 363: Reno, NV

Hollywood/Los Angeles area 

 Local B192: Amusement Area Employees
 Local 33: Stagehands and Projectionists
 Local 44: Affiliated Property Craftspersons
 Local 80: Motion Picture Studio Grips, Crafts Service, Set Medics, Marine and Warehouse Workers
 Local 399: Studio Transportation Drivers
 Local 399C: Location Managers
 Local 600: Cinematographers
 Local 614: Stagehands; San Bernardino and Inland Empire, CA
 Local 683: Lab, Film/Film/Video Technicians/Cinetechnicians
 Local 695: Production Sound Technicians, Television Engineers, Video Assist Technicians and Studio Projectionists
 Local 700: Editors
 Local 705: Motion Picture Costumers
 Local 706: Make-Up Artists & Hair Stylists
 Local 728: Motion Picture Studio Electrical Lighting Technicians
 Local 729: Motion Picture Set Painters & Sign Writers
 Local 767: First Aid 
 Local 800: Art Directors Guild
 Local 839: Animation Guild and Affiliated Optical Electronic and Graphic Arts
 Local 857: Treasurers & Ticket Sellers
 Local 871: Script Supervisors/Continuity, Coordinators, Accountants & Allied Production Specialists Guild
 Local 884: Motion Picture Studio Teachers and Welfare Workers
 Local 892: Costume Designers Guild
 Local 916: Stage & Picture Operators
 Local 923: Sound & Figure Maintenance Technicians; Anaheim, CA

San Francisco Bay Area 

 Local 16: San Francisco, California
 Local B-18: House Staff & Box Office Employees; San Francisco, CA
 Local 784: Theatrical Wardrobe; San Francisco, CA
 Local 166: Operators; San Francisco, CA
 Local 169: Operators; Oakland, CA
 Local 107: Oakland, CA
 Local 119: San Carlos, CA
 Local 134: San Jose, CA
 Local B-32: House & Box Office; San Jose, CA

District 3 - Connecticut, Maine, Massachusetts, New Hampshire, Rhode Island, Vermont 

 Local B4: Theater Employees; New England
 Local 481: Studio Mechanics; New England
Local 74: Southern CT
 Local 84: Hartford/Northern, CT
 Local 11: Stage Employees; Boston, MA
 Local 53: Springfield-Pittsfield, MA
 Local 96: Mixed; Worcester, MA
 Local 182: Operators; Boston, Lynn, Salem, Waltham, Brockton, Plymouth, Cape Cod, MA
 Local 195: Mixed; Lowell, MA and NH
Local 232: Stage Employees; Amherst, MA
 Local 114: Stage Employees; Portland, Lewiston, Augusta, Bangor, ME
 Local 926: Television Broadcasting Studio Employees; Auburn, ME
Local 919: Stage Employees; Burlington, VT; Hanover, Lebanon, NH
Local 23: Stage Employees; Providence, RI

District 4 - Delaware, District of Columbia, Maryland, Pennsylvania, Virginia, West Virginia 

 Local 22: Washington, DC
 Local 815: Electronic, Sound & Computer Service Technicians; Washington, DC
 Local 868: Treasurers & Ticket Sellers; Washington, DC
 Local B868: Ticket Sales Agents; Washington, DC
 Local 19: Baltimore, MD
 Local 487: Delaware, Maryland, and Virginia broadcast technicians and all the folks who made The Wire.
 Local 3: Pittsburgh, PA
 Local 8: Philadelphia, PA
 Local 82: Wilkes-Barre, PA
 Local 97: Reading, PA
 Local 113: Erie, PA
 Local 200: Lehigh Valley, PA
 Local 329: Scranton, PA
 Local 489: Studio Mechanics; Pittsburgh, PA
 Local 636: Greater Central Pennsylvania Areas of State College, Altoona, Johnstown, Lewisburg, Lewistown, Williamsport, Bloomsburg, Indiana, Selinsgrove, and Sunbury
 Local 902: Television station news and Engineering employees; Johnstown, PA
 Local 55: Roanoke, VA
 Local 285: Norfolk, VA
 Local 370: Motion Picture Projectionists, Operators, Video Technicians & Allied Crafts; Richmond, VA
 Local 64: Wheeling, WV
 Local 578: Morgantown, WV

District 5 - Colorado, New Mexico, Utah, Wyoming 

 Local 7: Denver, CO
 Local 62: Mixed; Colorado Springs & Pueblo, CO
 Local 280: Santa Fe, NM
 Local 480: New Mexico
 Local 229: Northern Colorado, Cheyenne & Laramie, WY
 Local 99: Salt Lake City, UT
 Local 838: Exhibition Employees; Salt Lake City, UT

District 6 - Arkansas, Oklahoma, Texas 

 Local 112: Oklahoma City, OK
 Local 204: Little Rock, AR
 Local 354: Tulsa, OK
 Local 484: Texas, OK
 Local 51: Houston-Galveston, TX
 Local 76: Stagehands; San Antonio, TX
 Local 126: Fort Worth, TX
 Local 127: Dallas, TX
 Local 183: Beaumont, TX
 Local 205: Austin, TX
 Local 604: Corpus Christi, Harlingen, Brownsville and McAllen, TX

District 7 - Alabama, Georgia, Louisiana, Mississippi, North Carolina, South Carolina, Tennessee 

 Local 39: New Orleans, LA
 Local 78: Stagehands; Birmingham, AL
 Local 278: Candler/Asheville, NC
 Local 298: Shreveport, LA
 Local 320: Savannah, GA
 Local 322: Stagehands; Charlotte, NC
 Local 333: Charleston, SC
 Local 347: Columbia, SC
 Local 417: Raleigh, Durham, Chapel Hill, Fayetteville, NC
 Local 478: Louisiana and Southern MS
 Local 479: Atlanta, GA
 Local 491: Studio Mechanics; North Carolina, South Carolina, and Savannah, GA
 Local 492: Tennessee & Northern MS
 Local 635: Winston-Salem, NC
 Local 824: Stagehands; Athens, GA
 Local 834: Exhibition Employees; Atlanta, GA
 Local 900: Mixed, Stagehands/Projectionists; Huntsville, AL
 Local 927: Stagehands; Atlanta, GA

District 8 - Kentucky, Indiana, Michigan, Ohio 

 Local 30: Indianapolis, IN
 Local 836: Exhibition Employees; Indianapolis, IN
 Local 26: Grand Rapids, MI (Western Michigan)
 Local 38: Detroit-Pontiac, MI
 Local 812: Sound, Teleprompter and Videotape Technicians; Michigan
 Local 5: Cincinnati, OH
 Local 12: Columbus, OH
 Local 24: Toledo, OH
 Local 27: Cleveland, OH
 Local 48: Akron-Canton-Mansfield, OH
 Local 66: Dayton, OH
 Local 101: Youngstown-Niles-Warren, Oh
 Local 160: Projectionists, Video Technicians; Cleveland, OH
 Local 209: Cleveland, OH
 Local B754: Admissions, Mutual Ticket Sellers; Cincinnati, OH
 Local 17: Louisville, KY
 Local 346: Lexington, KY

District 9 - Wisconsin, Iowa, Illinois, Missouri, Minnesota, North Dakota, South Dakota, Nebraska, Kansas 

 Local 42: Omaha, NE, Sioux City, IA
 Local 831: Wardrobe; Omaha, NE
 Local 67: Des Moines, IA
 Local 85 Davenport, IA
 Local 191: Cedar Rapids, Waterloo, Dubuque, IA
 Local 690: Iowa City, IA
Local 2: Stagehands; Chicago, IL
 Local 138: Springfield, IL
 Local 193: Mixed, Stage and Film; Bloomington, Peoria, Macomb, IL
 Local 421: Carterville/Herrin, IL
 Local 731: Mixed, Rapid City, SD
 Local 780: Motion Picture Videotape/Laboratory Technicians/Allied Crafts and Government Employees; Chicago, IL
 Local 6: St. Louis, MO
 Local 31: Kansas City, MO
 Local 805: Wardrobe/Hair & Makeup; St. Louis, MO
 Local 13: Minneapolis/St. Paul, MN
 Local 490: Studio Mechanics; Minneapolis/St. Paul
 Local 745: Broadcast; Minneapolis/St Paul, MN
 Local 18: Milwaukee, WI
 Local 251: Madison, WI
 Local 470: Oshkosh, WI Northeastern Wisconsin
 Local 110: Motion Picture Projectionists, Operators and Video Technicians; Chicago, IL
 Local 476: Studio Mechanics; Chicago, IL 
 Local 750: Treasurers and Ticket Sellers; Chicago, IL 
 Local 762: Television Broadcasting Studio Employees; Chicago, IL
 Local 769: Theatrical Wardrobe Union, Chicago, IL
 Local 124: Stagehands; Joliet, IL
Local 374: Operators; Joilet, IL
 Local 217: Mixed; Rockford, IL

District 10 - New York and New Jersey 
 Local 1: Stagehands; New York City (except Brooklyn and Queens), Long Island, and Westchester and Putnam Counties.
 Local 4: Stagehands; Brooklyn and Queens
 Local 9: Syracuse, NY
 Local 10: Buffalo, NY
 Local 14: Albany, NY
 Local 21: Stagehands Newark and Central New Jersey
 Local 25: Rochester, NY
 Local 52: Motion Picture Studio Mechanics
 Local 59: Stagehands Jersey City, NJ
 Local 74: Stagehands; Southern Connecticut
 Local 77: Mixed; Atlantic City/Vineland, NJ
 Local 121: Niagara Falls, NY
 Local 161: Script Supervisors/Continuity Coordinators, Production Office Coordinators, and Production Accountants
 Local 289: Elmira, NY
 Local 306: Motion Picture Operators, Projectionists, and Audio Visual Cinema Technicians New York, NY
 Local 353: Pt. Jervis, Sullivan County, NY
 Local 592: Saratoga Springs, NY
 Local 632: Stagehands Northern New Jersey
 Local 702: Laboratory Film/Video Technicians
 Local 751: Treasurers & Ticket Sellers
 Local 764: Theatrical Wardrobe Union
 Local 783: TWU - Theatrical Wardrobe Union; Buffalo, NY
 Local 798: Make-Up Artists & Hair Stylists
 Local 829: United Scenic Artists: Production Designers, Art Directors, Assistant Art Directors, Art Department Coordinators, Scenic Artists, Computer Artists
 Local 844: Radio and Television Sound Effects and Broadcast Studio Employees
 Local 917: Casino Hotel Employees; Atlantic City, NJ
 Local 18032: Association of Theatrical Press Agents and Managers
 Local AE936: Arena Employees; Albany, NY
 Local B751: Mail Telephone Order Clerks
 Local F72: Ball Park Ticket Sellers
 Local USA829: United Scenic Artists; CA, IL, NY

District 14 - Florida, Puerto Rico, U.S. Virgin Islands 

 Local 631: Mixed; Orlando, FL
 Local 321: Mixed; Tampa Bay, FL
 Local 835: Exhibition Employees; Orlando, FL
 Local 500: Mixed; South Florida
 Local 647: Stagehands; Southwest Florida
 Local 115: Mixed; Jacksonville, Gainesville, and Tallahassee, FL
 Local 477: Studio Mechanics 
 Local 843: Animation Guild and Affiliated Optical Electronic and Graphic Arts; Orlando, FL
 Local AE937: Arena Employees; Tampa, FL
Local AE938: Arena Employees; Jacksonville, FL

Canada

District 11 - Ontario, Quebec, New Brunswick, Nova Scotia, Prince Edward Island, Newfoundland, Labrador 

 Local 580: Stagehands; Windsor, Ontario
 Local 129: Stagehands; Hamilton, Ontario
 Local 523: Québec, Quebec

District 12 - Manitoba, Saskatchewan, Alberta, British Columbia 

 Local 118: Stagehands; Vancouver
 Local 168: Stagehands; Vancouver Island
 Local 891: Artists and Technicians; British Columbia and Yukon

Unsorted locals

Canada 

 Toronto Stagehands (Local 58 Toronto)
 Camerapersons (Local 669 Western Canada)
 International Cinematographers Guild (Local 667 Eastern Canada)
 Motion Picture Studio Production Technicians (Locals 849 Atlantic Canada, 856 Manitoba, 873 Toronto, 411 Toronto, and 891 Vancouver)
 Halifax Stagehands (Local 680 Halifax)
 Scenic Artists and Propmakers (Local 828 Ontario)
 Ottawa-Kingston Stagehands and Operators (Local 471 Ottawa-Kingston)
 Regina-Moose Jaw (Local 295)
 Saskatoon (Local 300)
 Edmonton (Local 210)
 Niagara Region, Ontario (Production, Audience Services, Facilities) Local 461
 Calgary (Local 212)
 Montréal Film Technicians (Local 514)
 Montréal FOH and Projectionists (Local 262)
 Montréal Stagehands (Local 56)
 Winnipeg Stagehands (Local 63)
 St. John's, Newfoundland (mixed Local 709)
 Charlottetown, Prince Edward Island ( mixed Local 906 )

Locals in numerous areas, by type 

 Mixed (locals in 132 areas)
 Motion Picture Projectionists, Operators and Video Technicians (locals in 11 areas)
 Operators (locals in 22 areas)
 Stage Employees (locals in 94 areas)
 Studio Mechanics (locals in 19 areas)
 Theatre Employees (locals in 21 areas)
 Treasurers & Ticket Sellers (locals in 11 areas)
 Television Broadcasting Studio Employees (locals in 14 areas)
 Theatrical Wardrobe Union (locals in 40 areas)

References

International Alliance of Theatrical Stage Employees
Arts-related lists
Lists of trade union locals